George Whitworth may refer to:

 George F. Whitworth (1816–1907), American missionary
 George Whitworth (footballer, born 1896) (1896–?), English footballer
 George Whitworth (footballer, born 1927) (1927–2006), English footballer